This is a list of schools in North Northamptonshire, a unitary authority in the English county of Northamptonshire.

State-funded schools

Primary schools

Alfred Street Junior School, Rushden
All Saints CE Primary School and Nursery, Wellingborough
The Avenue Infant School, Wellingborough
Barton Seagrave Primary School, Barton Seagrave
Beanfield Primary School, Corby
Bozeat Community Primary School, Bozeat
Brambleside Primary School, Kettering
Brigstock Lathams CE Primary School, Brigstock
Broughton Primary School, Broughton
Compass Primary Academy, Kettering
Corby Old Village Primary School, Corby
Corby Primary Academy, Corby
Cottingham CE Primary School, Cottingham
Cranford CE Primary School, Cranford
Croyland Primary School, Wellingborough
Danesholme Infant Academy, Corby
Danesholme Junior Academy, Corby
Denfield Park Primary School, Rushden
Earls Barton Primary School, Earls Barton
Ecton Village Primary School, Ecton
Exeter School, Corby
Finedon Infant School, Finedon
Finedon Mulso CE Junior School, Finedon
Freemans Endowed CE Junior Academy, Wellingborough
Geddington CE Primary School, Geddington
Glapthorn CE Primary School, Glapthorn
Grange Primary Academy, Kettering
Great Addington CE Primary School, Great Addington
Great Doddington Primary School, Great Doddington
Greenfields Primary School and Nursery, Kettering
Grendon CE Primary School, Grendon
Gretton Primary School, Gretton
Hall Meadow Primary School, Kettering
Havelock Infant School, Desborough
Havelock Junior School, Desborough
Hawthorn Community Primary School, Kettering
Hayfield Cross CE School, Kettering
Hazel Leys Academy, Corby
Henry Chichele Primary School, Higham Ferrers
Higham Ferrers Junior School, Higham Ferrers
Higham Ferrers Nursery and Infant School, Higham Ferrers
Irchester Community Primary School, Irchester
Irthlingborough Junior School, Irthlingborough
Irthlingborough Nursery and Infant School, Irthlingborough
Isham Church of England Primary School, Isham
Kettering Buccleuch Academy, Kettering
Kettering Park Infant Academy, Kettering
Kettering Park Junior Academy, Kettering
Kings Cliffe Endowed Primary School, Kings Cliffe
Kingswood Primary Academy, Corby
Little Harrowden Community Primary School, Little Harrowden
Little Stanion Primary School, Corby
Loatsland Primary School, Desborough
Loddington CE Primary School, Loddington
Mawsley Primary School, Mawsley
Meadowside Primary School, Burton Latimer
Mears Ashby CE Primary School, Mears Ashby
Millbrook Infant School, Kettering
Millbrook Junior School, Kettering
Nassington Primary School, Nassington
Newton Road School, Rushden
Oakley Vale Primary School, Corby
Oakway Academy, Wellingborough
Olympic Primary, Wellingborough
Oundle CE Primary School, Oundle
Our Lady of Walsingham RC Primary School, Corby
Our Lady's RC Primary School, Wellingborough
Park Junior School, Wellingborough
Polebrook CE Primary School, Polebrook
Priors Hall School, Corby
Pytchley Endowed CE Primary School, Pytchley
Raunds Park Infant School, Raunds
Redwell Primary School, Wellingborough
Ringstead CE Primary School, Ringstead
Rockingham Primary School, Corby
Rothwell Junior School, Rothwell
Rothwell Victoria Infant School, Rothwell
Rowan Gate Primary School, Wellingborough
Rushden Primary Academy, Rushden
Rushton Primary School, Rushton
Ruskin Academy, Wellingborough
Ruskin Infant School, Wellingborough
St Andrew's Church of England Primary School, Kettering
St Barnabas Church of England Primary School, Wellingborough
St Brendan's Catholic Primary School, Corby
St Edward's Catholic Primary School, Kettering
St Mary's CE Primary School, Burton Latimer
St Mary's CE Primary School, Kettering
St Patrick's RC Primary School, Corby
St Peter's CE Academy, Raunds
St Thomas More RC Primary School, Corby
South End Infant School, Rushden
South End Junior School, Rushden
Stanion CE Primary School, Stanion
Stanton Cross Primary School, Stanton Cross
Stanwick Academy, Stanwick
Studfall Infant Academy, Corby
Studfall Junior Academy, Corby
Sywell CE Primary School, Sywell
Tennyson Road Infant School, Rushden
Thrapston Primary School, Thrapston
Titchmarsh CE Primary School, Titchmarsh
Trinity CE Primary School, Aldwincle
Victoria Primary Academy, Wellingborough
Warmington School, Warmington
Warwick Academy, Wellingborough
Weldon CE Primary School, Weldon
Whitefriars Primary School, Rushden
Wilbarston CE Primary School, Wilbarston
Wilby CE Primary School, Wilby
Windmill Primary School, Raunds
Wollaston Community Primary School, Wollaston
Woodford CE Primary School, Woodford
Woodnewton School, Corby

Secondary schools

 Bishop Stopford School, Kettering
 Brooke Weston Academy, Corby
 Corby Business Academy, Corby
 Corby Technical School, Corby
 The Ferrers School, Higham Ferrers
 Huxlow Academy, Irthlingborough
 Kettering Buccleuch Academy, Kettering
 Kettering Science Academy, Kettering
 Kingswood Secondary Academy, Corby
 The Latimer Arts College, Barton Seagrave
 Lodge Park Academy, Corby
 Manor School and Sports College, Raunds
 Montsaye Academy, Rothwell
 Prince William School, Oundle
 Rushden Academy, Rushden
 Sir Christopher Hatton Academy, Wellingborough
 Southfield School, Kettering
 Weavers Academy, Wellingborough
 Wollaston School, Wollaston
 Wrenn School, Wellingborough

Special and alternative schools
 Chelveston Road School, Higham Ferrers
 Friars Academy, Wellingborough
 Isebrook School, Kettering
 Kingsley Special Academy, Kettering
 Maplefields Academy, Corby
 Red Kite Academy, Corby
 Wren Spinney Community School, Kettering

Further education
 East Northamptonshire College
 Tresham College of Further and Higher Education

Independent schools

Primary and preparatory schools
 Laxton Junior School, Oundle
 St Peter's School, Kettering

Senior and all-through schools
 Oundle School, Oundle
 Wellingborough School, Wellingborough

Special and alternative schools
Progress Schools, Thrapston
Refocus, Wellingborough
Youth Works Community College, Kettering

North Northamptonshire
Schools in North Northamptonshire
Schools